The Dallas International Piano Competition, originally known as the Dallas Chamber Symphony (or DCS) International Piano Competition, is an annual competition hosted by the Dallas Chamber Symphony and Southern Methodist University’s Meadows School of the Arts.  The competition was first held in 2013.

Created by Dallas Chamber Symphony Artistic Director and Conductor Richard McKay and presented at Southern Methodist University, the competition offers professional and pre-professional pianists the opportunity to perform before an internationally-renowned jury.

As one of the prizes is to play with the Dallas Chamber Symphony, applicants are encouraged to explore pieces that are well-suited for accompaniment by a chamber orchestra.

Contestants who do not advance past Round One participate in a masterclass and private lessons while contestants who advance to Round Two do not participate, rather, they just continue in the competition rounds.

Prizes 
Cash prizes are $400 for honorable mention, $500 for third place, $1,000 for second, and $1,500 for first.  The winner also performs their prize-winning concerto with the Dallas Chamber Symphony.

Venues 
Most competition events take place at Southern Methodist University’s Owen Arts Center.  The DCS accompanies the winner in a performance on the season finale concert at Dallas City Performance Hall.

Past winners 
The following is a list of previous first-prize winners of the Dallas International Piano Competition:
 2013: Congcong Chai, China
 2014: Kyle Orth, United States
 2015: Saetbyeol Serena Kim, South Korea
 2016: Kenneth Broberg, United States
 2017: Yibing Zhang, China
 2018: Hsin-Hao Yang, Taiwan

References

External links 
Official website
DCSO website
Southern Methodist University’s Meadows Music Program website
Dallas City Performance Hall website
Southern Methodist University’s Caruth Auditorium website

Piano competitions in the United States
Texas classical music
2013 establishments in Texas
Culture of Dallas
Recurring events established in 2013